Bradarac may refer to the following villages in Serbia:

 Bradarac (Aleksinac), municipality of Aleksinac
 Bradarac (Požarevac), municipality of Požarevac